Big Jim Garrity is a 1916 silent drama film directed by George Fitzmaurice and starring Robert Edeson, Eleanor Woodruff and Carl Harbaugh. The film has been restored by the Cinémathèque Française.

Cast
 Robert Edeson as Jim Garrity 
 Eleanor Woodruff as Sylvia Craigen 
 Carl Harbaugh as Dawson 
 Lyster Chambers as Dr. Hugh Malone 
 Charles Compton as Sam Craigen 
 Carleton Macy as Mr. Craigen

References

Bibliography
James Robert Parish & Michael R. Pitts. Film directors: a guide to their American films. Scarecrow Press, 1974.

External links
 

1916 films
1916 drama films
1910s English-language films
American silent feature films
Silent American drama films
American black-and-white films
Films directed by George Fitzmaurice
Pathé Exchange films
1910s American films